Darinan may refer to:
 Darinan, Isfahan
 Darinan, Kerman

See also
 Darniyan (disambiguation)